Zijlstra is a West Frisian toponymic or occupational surname meaning "from/of the Zijl", a Middle Dutch name for a type of sluice (Modern Dutch Spuisluis, German Siel). The suffix "-stra" is derived from old Germanic -sater, meaning sitter or dweller. The name could thus be referring to a lock keeper. Variant forms are Zeijlstra, Zeilstra, Zylstra, and Sylstra. The latter is the common spelling abroad. People with this name include:

Anca Zijlstra (born 1973), Dutch darts player
Auke Zijlstra (born 1964), Dutch politician (PVV)
Carla Zijlstra (born 1969), Dutch speed skater
Halbe Zijlstra (born 1969), Dutch politician (VVD), Minister of Foreign Affairs 2017–18
Hieke Zijlstra (born 1981), Dutch footballer
Jelle Zijlstra (1918–2001), Dutch politician (ARP), economist and banker, Prime Minister 1966–67
Kees Zijlstra (1931–2013), Dutch politician (PvdA) and civil servant
Martin Zijlstra (1944–2014), Dutch politician (PvdA)
Rinse Zijlstra (1927–2017), Dutch politician (ARP), brother of Jelle
Sipke Zijlstra (born 1985), Dutch racing cyclist
Wout Zijlstra (born 1964), Dutch strongman
Zeilstra
Bart Zeilstra (born 1982), Dutch rapper and singer known as "Baas B"
Zylstra
Bernard Zylstra (1934–1986), Canadian political scientist
Brandon Zylstra (born 1993), American football player
Gerben Zylstra (born 1959), American biochemist
Shane Zylstra (born 1996), American football player

References

Occupational surnames
Surnames of Frisian origin
Dutch toponymic surnames

de:Zijlstra
pl:Zijlstra
simple:Zijlstra